Rachelle Pirie (born 12 January 1977) is a former Australian rugby union player.

Pirie competed for Australia in the 2006 Rugby World Cup in Canada. She made two test appearances for Australia at the tournament; she played against South Africa and the United States in the pool games. She was named as a replacement in the match against Ireland for seventh place, but did not get to run onto the field.

References 

1977 births
Living people
Australian female rugby union players
Australia women's international rugby union players